The Fujitsu Frontiers are an American football team located in Kawasaki, Kanagawa, Japan.  They are a member of the X-League.

Team history
1985 Team was founded by the Fujitsu Group.
1986 Promoted from X2 to X1.
1992 Pearl Bowl runner-up
2000 Won first divisional title.
2002 Japan X Bowl runner-up.
2005 Satoshi Fujita hired as head coach.
2006 Won 1st Pearl Bowl Championship.
2009 Japan X Bowl runner-up
2010 Won second Pearl Bowl Championship.
2014 Won 1st X-League title and 1st National title.
2015 Japan X Bowl Runner-up.
2016 Won 2nd X-League & National title.

Seasons
{| class="wikitable"
|bgcolor="#FFCCCC"|X-League Champions (1987–present)
|bgcolor="#DDFFDD"|<small>Division Champions</small>
|bgcolor="#D0E7FF"|Final Stage/Semifinals Berth
|bgcolor="#96CDCD"|Wild Card /2nd Stage Berth
|}

Head coaches

Current Import PlayersFormer Import Players'''

References

External links
  (Japanese)

American football in Japan
Fujitsu
1985 establishments in Japan
American football teams established in 1985
X-League teams